Honnasandra Narasimhaiah Chandrashekar (born 28 August 1953), known popularly as Mukhyamantri Chandru, is an Indian actor and politician. As an actor, he is known for his work in Kannada theatre and cinema. The sobriquet Mukhyamantri (Chief Minister) stuck to his name after the play of the same name that sees him portray the titular role became widely popular. Having portrayed mostly comic and negative roles throughout his career, Chandru is a character actor, and has acted in over 500 films since making his debut in 1983.

Chandru joined the Janata Party in 1985 and won the year's assembly elections from Gauribidanur. Switching to Bharatiya Janata Party (BJP), he became a member of the legislative council in 1998 and 2004. He served as the chairperson of the Kannada Development Authority till 2013 before quitting the party to join the Indian National Congress (INC) in 2014. Eight years later, he joined the Aam Aadmi Party.

Personal life 
Chandru was born on 28 August 1953 into a family of farmers of Narasimhaiah and Thimmamma in Honnasandra, a village in the taluk of Nelamangala of Bangalore Rural district, in the Indian State of Mysore (now called Karnataka). He completed schooling at Siddaganga Matha in Tumkur He is a follower of Jainism  before obtaining his bachelor's degree in science from Government Arts and Science College in Bangalore in 1974. There he was drawn to theatre after being a regular viewer of plays at the Ravindra Kalakshetra. He subsequently worked as a clerk in Bangalore University and also acting in plays at the same time.

Chandru married actress Padma in June 1983. They appeared as a couple in the Oohh Lalaa and the latter played Chief Minister in the 2000s soap opera Maneyondu Mooru Bagilu. They have two sons together, Bharath and Sharath. Recognizing his contribution to Kannada theatre and activism in promoting and safeguarding Kannada-language, Chandru was awarded an honorary doctorate by the Gulbarga University.

Acting career 
In 1978, Chandru, then a part of the troupe Kalagangotri, was chosen to play Krishna Dwaipayana Kaushal, the Chief Minister of a fictitious Indian State of Udayanchal. The role went to him after Lohithaswa, the actor who was to play the role, fell ill. Titled Mukhyamantri, Chief Minister in Kannada, the play is an adaptation of a 1976 book of the same name written by Ranjit Kapoor. In the play, the Chief Minister's role is shortened to KD Kaushal or KeDi, a word used to refer to a delinquent. Chandru "incorporated [his] own dialogues while acting, eventually turning the serious drama into a comedy". The play became widely popular and the sobriquet 'Mukhyamantri' stuck to him. As of January 2020, the play completed its 700th show across India and outside.

Chandru's career in films began in 1983 when he was cast by producer N. Veeraswamy to play a supporting role in Chakravyuha. His other notable role came in the comedy Ganeshana Maduve (1990) that saw him play an overbearing landlord, alongside Anant Nag.

Political life 
Chandru accepted the ticket offered by the ruling Janata Party to contest the assembly elections from Gauribidanur. This followed after actors Anant Nag and Shankar Nag denied. Chandru won the seat by a margin of over 6,600 votes. Speaking about an incident to The Times of India of his stint as the Member of the Legislative Assembly, he said that the officers who assisted him when he "decided to get tough with the sand-mining mafia controlled by a liquor baron in his constituency" were transferred, and when he complained to Chief Minister Ramakrishna Hegde, he was to told to "get practical". Following the term, he contested unsuccessfully from the Chikballapur constituency in the 1989 Lok Sabha elections. His party merged with two other parties at the time to become Janata Dal.

In the early 1990s, with "rift between [Ramakrishna] Hegde and Deve Gowda worsening", Chandru quit the Janata Dal. In 1991, he joined the Bharatiya Janata Party. He was nominated as a member of the Karnataka Legislative Council in 1998 and for the second time in 2004, completing the term in 2010. In 2008, he was appointed the chairperson of the Kannada Development Authority. The position was the same rank of a cabinet minister, and Chandru was retained by the subsequent governments, despite his resignation from BJP in 2013. He cited "dedicat[ing himself] for the cause of the State and Kannada language" as the reason for the quitting. In March 2014, he joined the Indian National Congress (INC).

In his tenure as the chairperson of the Kannada Development Authority (KDA), Chandru advocated very strongly for the protection and promotion of the Kannada-language. The beginning of his tenure saw a significant development in that, on 31 October 2008, Kannada was given the status of a classical language. Recommendations made by him in view of promoting the language in Karnataka were met with both praise and criticism. In December, he called for a compulsory display of vehicle registration plates of all vehicles of the State government in Kannada starting January 2009.

In 2011, under Chandru's chairpersonship, the KDA recommended to the Karnataka government to make it mandatory for immigrants in the State to clear the Class VII-level tests of the language. Chandru felt that if "outsiders ... live off the resources here, they should also learn to understand the culture, history and language of the land". Other recommendations included the use of Kannada software in cellphones, and to take over all ancient palm-leaf manuscripts in private possession and declare them state property. Chandru was instrumental in the Kempegowda International Airport authorities agreeing to display signboards and nameplates in Kannada, in 2012.

Chandru pitched for making Kannada a compulsory subject from Classes I to V. In an interview with The Times of India in 2009, he had declared that his goal was to successfully implement Kannada as an administrative language in all government offices, and push for a legislation that mandates compulsory learning of Kannada from Classes I to IV. Disappointed with not being  nominated by the INC to the Karnataka Legislative Council, Chandru quit the party in May 2022. He stated, "The party also did not give me any position. Just as an eyewash, I was made the president of the cultural cell, which I rejected." On 7 June 2022, he joined the  Aam Aadmi Party.

Activism 
In the first decade of the 21st century, Chandru is involved in various Kannada language activities concerning to the public, government and the mass media, has been instrumental in setting up bodies for the classical language's enhancement & encouragement.

Partial filmography 

 Chakravyuha (1983)
 Mududida Tavare Aralithu (1983)
 Premigala Saval (1984)
 Naanu Nanna Hendthi (1985)
 Jwaalamukhi (1985)
 Swabhimana (1985)
 Bete (1986)
 Guri (1987)
 Sangliyana (1988)
 Anjada Gandu (1988)
 Avale Nanna Hendthi (1988)
 Ondaagi Baalu (1989)
 Neenu Nakkare Haalu Sakkare (1989)
 Poli Huduga (1989)
 Challenge Gopala Krishna (1989)
 S. P. Sangliyana Part 2 (1990)
 Policana Hendati (1990)
 Golmaal Radhakrishna (1990)
 Ganeshana Maduve (1990)
 Golmaal RadhaKrishna Part 2 (1991)
 Kitturina Huli (1991)
 Gauri Ganesha (1991)
 Ibbaru Hendira Muddina Police (1991)
 Readymade Ganda (1991)
 Gruhapravesha (1991)
 Hendtire Hushaar (1992)
 Gopikrishna (1992)
 Solillada Saradara (1992)
 Ganesha Subramanya (1992)
 Malashree Mamashree (1992)
 Ondu Cinema Kathe (1992)
 Chikkejamanru (1992)
 Chinna (1994)
 Yarigu Helbedi (1994)
 Ibbara Naduve Muddina Aata (1996)
 Sipayi (1996)
 Ammavra Ganda (1997)
 Lakshmi Mahalakshmi (1997)
 Suryavamsha (1999)
 Galate Aliyandru (2000)
 Mathadana (2001)
 Simhadriya Simha (2002)
 Stumble (2003)...Diwakar
 Mr Bakra (2005)...Shankar
 Pandu Ranga Vittala (2005)
 Kallarali Hoovagi (2006)
 Milana (2007)
 Manasugula Mathu Madhura (2008)
 Chikkapete Sachagalu (2009)
 Govindaya Namaha (2012)
 Law (2020)
 Munduvareda Adhyaya (2021)

References

External links 

 
 Mukhyamantri Chandru profile

Living people
1953 births
Male actors in Kannada cinema
Indian male film actors
Karnataka MLAs 1985–1989
Male actors from Bangalore
Bharatiya Janata Party politicians from Karnataka
20th-century Indian male actors
21st-century Indian male actors
Indian actor-politicians